Sunset Lawn Chapel of the Chimes is a cemetery and funeral home complex in Sacramento, California. It was opened in 1938.

Notable burials
 Danny Nardico (1925–2010), boxer, known for being the only fighter to score a knockdown against Jake LaMotta

References

External links
 Sunset Lawn Chapel of the Chimes website
 
 

Cemeteries in Sacramento County, California
1938 establishments in California